David Crane may refer to:

People
 David Crane (historian) (fl. 1999–2013), British historian
 David Crane (lawyer) (born 1950), former Chief Prosecutor for the U.N. War Crimes Tribunal for Sierra Leone
 David Crane (politics) (born 1953), political advisor to Arnold Schwarzenegger and lecturer at Stanford University
 David Crane (producer) (born 1957), co-creator of the popular sitcom Friends
 David Crane (programmer) (born 1953), video game designer, programmer and co-founder of Activision
 David W. Crane (born 1959), American lawyer, investment banker and business executive
 David Crane, the son of Niles Crane and Daphne Moon in the sitcom Frasier

Other uses
 David Crane (comic strip), created by Win Mortimer

See also
 Crane (surname)